Basisfjellet is a mountain in Gustav V Land at Nordaustlandet, Svalbard. It has a height of 460 m.a.s.l. and is located on the peninsula Laponiahalvøya, at the northeastern side of Brennevinsfjorden.

References

Mountains of Nordaustlandet